is a Buddhist temple of the Tendai sect in Kasai, Hyōgo, Japan.

It was first established in 650 at Emperor Kōtoku's request, and the temple complex and buildings have undergone several periods of destruction and reconstruction since its founding, with most of its present structures dating to the 16-17th century. It is famous for its Heian period three-storied pagoda, built in 1171 in the wayō style of Japanese architecture and designated a National Treasure of Japan. Other important building in the temple complex include the kondō (main hall), built in 1628 by order of Honda Tadamasa, the lord of Himeji Castle, and three other smaller structures, Gohōdō, Myokendō and Bentendō, and a gorintō, all of them built between the Kamakura and Muromachi periods and designated Important Cultural Properties.

Ichijō-ji is temple No. 26 in the Kansai Kannon Pilgrimage, following Kiyomizu-dera and preceding Engyō-ji.

History 
Ichijō-ji is said to have been founded in 650 by the Indian priest Hōdō Sennin at Emperor Kōtoku's instruction. Hōdō  visited Kyoto in 649 and prayed for the ill Emperor Kōtoku. When the Emperor regained his health, the priest earned his trust, and had him establish several buddhist temples in the Hyogo prefecture, including the previous stop in the Kansai Kannon Pilgrimage, Kiyomizu-dera.

The three-storied pagoda was built in 1171, in the late Heian period. It is believed that the temple was originally built at the foot of Mt. Kasamatsu, 2.5 kilometers north, where a temple now  called Furubokke-ji (Old Lotus Temple) is located. But at least by the time the pagoda was completed, Ichijō-ji had already been moved to its present location.

The datation of other surviving structures at Ichijō-ji, including the Gohōdō (1275-1332), gorintō (1321), Bentendō (1393-1466) and Myokendō (1467-1572) show the temple's continuous growth during the Kamakura and Muromachi periods.

In 1523 the temple complex, with the exception of the pagoda, burned down due to civil wars of the Sengoku period. The daimyō of Harima, Akamatsu Yoshitsuke, rebuilt many of the building in 1562. The complex was again destroyed by fire in 1628, and once more only the three-storied pagoda survived.

That same year, in 1628, Honda Tadamasa, the daimyō of the Himeji and Kuwana Domains and lord of Himeji Castle, rebuilt the main hall (kondō), which survives to this day. The bell tower, which has also survived, was completed the next year.

The historic and artistic value of some of the buildings at Ichijō-ji were recognized by the Agency for Cultural Affairs of Japan during the 20th century. During the Meiji period, in 1901, the three-storied pagoda was designated an Important Cultural Property. In 1913 (Taishō period), the three building behind the kondō were designated as separate Important Cultural Properties. In the Shōwa period, the pagoda was promoted to the category of National Treasure in 1952 under the new 1951 Law for the Protection of Cultural Properties. The gorintō dated from 1321 was designated an Important Cultural Property in 1953, and the kondō in 1983.

Architecture

Three-storied pagoda 
The oldest and most important structure at Ichijō-ji is its . The original pagoda was destroyed during the conflicts leading to the Genpei War, and rebuilt soon after using donations collected by the wandering kanjin priest, as imperial patronage of Ichijō-ji had ended with the rise of the new military ruling class.

It was completed in 1171 in the late Heian period, using  architecture. This style was developed during the Heian period, mainly by the esoteric sects Tendai and Shingon, and coined in the Kamakura period to distinguish it from the newer zenshūyō and daibutsuyō styles of architecture.

The pagoda is 3x3 ken, and has a hongawarabuki roof, a tile roof composed of flat broad concave tiles and semi-cylindrical convex tiles covering the seams of the former.

Inside the pagoda there is a central pole standing up to the third floor, symbolic of Mount Sumeru, the center of the universe in the Buddhist cosmology. The spire at the top of third floor continues the pole.

It was designated a National Treasure of Japan in the category of temples in 1952, following its designation as an Important Cultural Property in 1901.

Kondō 
The main hall of Ichijō-ji is its . The original building was destroyed by fire in 1523 and then again in 1628. The present main hall was rebuilt by order of Honda Tadamasa in 1628. The pine and cypress timber used for its construction were brought from Kyushu and Shikoku.

It is a 9x8 ken single-storied building in the irimoya and kake-zukuri style, with hongawarabuki roof, and a typical example of main hall buildings from the early Edo period. It is the largest main hall on the Kansai Kannon Pilgrimage.

A typhoon damaged the building in 1999. During the subsequent survey of the structure other problems were discovered, including damage due to white ants and rotting in the structural beams. The kondō was carefully dismantled and restored between 1999 and 2007, preserving as much of the original materials as possible. The main hall was finally reopened in 2007.

It was designated an Important Cultural Property in 1983.

Bentendō and Myokendō 
These two Shinto shrine buildings are located together directly northwest of the kondō.

The  is the older and smaller of the two, located to the left. It is dated from the 1393-1466 in the middle Muromachi period. Bentendō are temples or shrines dedicated to Benten or Benzaiten, the syncretic goddess of wealth, happiness, wisdom and music in Shinto and japanese Buddhism. This small 1x1 ken  building employs the kasuga-zukuri style of architecture.

The , located on the right, dates from 1467-1572 in the late Muromachi period. It enshrines Myōken, a bosatsu (bodhisattva) who is the deification of the North Star. It is slightly larger with 3x1 ken, and uses the sangensha style of nagare-zukuri architecture.

Both buildings were designated an Important Cultural Properties in April 1913.

Other buildings 
Gohōdō - Important Cultural Property  
Gorintō - Important Cultural Property
Jōgyōdō
Kaizandō
Taishidō
Bell tower

See also 
National Treasures of Japan
List of National Treasures of Japan (temples)
List of National Treasures of Japan (paintings)

Gallery

Notes

External links 

Ichijō-ji at Sacred Japan
法華山　一乗寺 　加西市観光案内 (Japanese)
法華山一乗寺  かさい観光Navi (Japanese)

7th-century establishments in Japan
National Treasures of Japan
Important Cultural Properties of Japan
Tendai
Tendai temples
Pagodas in Japan
Buddhist temples in Hyōgo Prefecture
7th-century Buddhist temples
Religious buildings and structures completed in 650